Black anarchism (also known as panther anarchism) is a term applied to a group of people of African descent who identify with the principles of anarchism. These people include, but are not limited to, Ashanti Alston, Kuwasi Balagoon, Lorenzo Kom'boa Ervin, Greg Jackson, and Martin Sostre. Critics of the term suggest that it broadly eclipses important political differences between these multi-varied thinkers and incorrectly presents them as having a shared theory or movement. Black anarchism has had a major influence on the anarchist movement, black anarchists have a 100-year history in black-led  anti-fascist and anti-racist history.

Regardless, the individuals to whom the label has been applied all oppose the existence of the state, the subjugation and domination of Black people and other ethnic groups and favor a non-hierarchical organization of society. In general, these individuals argue for class struggle while stressing the importance of ending racial and national oppression, opposing capitalism, patriarchy, the state, and white supremacy.

Worldview
Black anarchists generally rejected narrow or explicit forms of anarchism that ignore issues of race and national oppression. Pedro Ribeiro defines it as a deformed "white, petty-bourgeois Anarchism that cannot relate to the people" and that refuses to talk or deal with issues of race by saying "No, don't talk about racism unless it is in that very abstract sense of we-are-all-equal-let's-sing-kumbayas-and-pretend-the-color-of-our-skin-does-not-matter anti-racism." 

Ashanti Alston, who has explicitly used the term Black anarchism, also argued that "Black culture has always been oppositional and is all about finding ways to creatively resist oppression here, in the most racist country in the world [the United States]. So, when I speak of a Black anarchism, it is not so tied to the color of my skin but who I am as a person, as someone who can resist, who can see differently when I am stuck, and thus live differently." As an anarchist, Alston added that he viewed Black nationalism as progressive yet also as deeply limited, stating that:

"Panther anarchism is ready, willing and able to challenge old nationalist and revolutionary notions that have been accepted as 'common-sense.' It also challenges the bullshit in our lives and in the so-called movement that holds us back from building a genuine movement based on the enjoyment of life, diversity, practical self-determination and multi-faceted resistance to the Babylonian Pigocracy. This Pigocracy is in our 'heads,' our relationships as well as in the institutions that have a vested interest in our eternal domination."

Contemporary
Most recently, activists and scholars have emphasized the importance of Black anarchism in the formation of histories surrounding the Black Liberation Army, Black Panther Party and other modes of the Black radical tradition beginning with slave rebellions in the European colonies of the late 18th century to the present day. In As Black As Resistance: Finding the Conditions of Liberation, activists William C. Anderson, Mariame Kaba and Zoé Samudzi, describe the necessity of Black anarchism in current political struggles, arguing that "Black Americans are residents of a settler colony, not truly citizens of the United States.

Despite a constitution laden with European Enlightenment values and a document of independence declaring certain inalienable rights, Black existence was legally that of private property until postbellum emancipation. The Black American condition today is an evolved condition directly connected to this history of slavery, and that will continue to be the case as long as the United States remains as an ongoing settler project. Nothing short of a complete dismantling of the American state as it presently exists can or will disrupt this."<ref n

See also 

 Anarchism and nationalism
 Anarchist Black Cross Network
 African anarchism
 Black Liberation Army
 Black separatism
 MOVE
 Prison abolition movement
 Zabalaza Anarchist Communist Front

Notes

External links 
 "Black Anarchism" by Chuck Morse includes transcript of a talk by Ashanti Alston.
 "Anarchist Panther".
 "Black Anarchism. A Reader".
 "Black Anarchism – Has Its Time Come?".
 "Senzala or Quilombo: Reflections on APOC and the fate of Black Anarchism"
 "Kuwasi Balagoon"
 "Anarchy and Chaos in Black Communities" by Robert A. Wicks at LewRockwell.com ("pro-market" anarchism).

African-American leftism
Anarchism in the United States
Anarchist movements
Anarchist schools of thought
Black Power
Far-left politics in the United States
Politics and race